Meritxell Mateu i Pi (born January 19, 1966) is an Andorran politician, member of the Partit Liberal d'Andorra who served as Minister of Foreign Affairs from 2007 to 2009, being the first female to hold this office. Previous positions she has held include ambassadorships to France, the Netherlands, Denmark, Germany, and Slovenia. In 2011 she became a member of the Andorran Parliament.

References

1966 births
Living people
Foreign Ministers of Andorra
Female foreign ministers
Ambassadors of Andorra to the Netherlands
Ambassadors of Andorra to Denmark
Ambassadors of Andorra to Germany
Ambassadors of Andorra to Slovenia
Ambassadors of Andorra to France
Women government ministers of Andorra
Liberal Party of Andorra politicians
21st-century women politicians
Andorran women ambassadors
Andorran women diplomats